Nazar Hamed (born 3 October 1988) is a Sudanese football defender who plays for Al-Hilal and the Sudan national football team.

International goals
As of match played 31 May 2016. Sudan score listed first, score column indicates score after each Hamid goal.

Honours

Clubs
Al-Hilal Club
Sudan Premier League 
Champions (5): 2012, 2014, 2016, 2017, 2020-21
Sudan Cup
Winner (1): 2016

References

External links

1988 births
Living people
Association football midfielders
Sudanese footballers
Sudan international footballers
2012 Africa Cup of Nations players
Al-Hilal Club (Omdurman) players
People from Kassala (state)
Sudan Premier League players
Alamal SC Atbara players